The 2009 AMA National Speedway Championship Series

Event format 
Over the course of 12 elimination races, 20 heats each rider raced against every other rider once.  The riders get placed in a main event according to their earned points. The championship was run over three rounds at the Costa Mesa Speedway in Costa Mesa, California and the Gold Country Fairgrounds in Auburn, California.

The Final Classification

References 

AMA
United States
AMA National Speedway Championship
Speed